TEDxBermuda is an independently organized, licensed TED conference, held each year in Bermuda since 2011.

Main Events

Featured Speakers 
April 2011
 Jonathan Vaughters - CEO of Slipstream Sports / Manager of UCI WorldTeam Cannondale-Garmin http://www.slipstreamsports.com/
 Keith Caisey - Percussionist / Ethnomusicologist
 Dr. Michael Lomas - Senior Research Scientist at the Bermuda Institute of Ocean Sciences
 Captain Paul Watson - Founder of Sea Shepherd Conservation Society
 OB Sisay - Head of Africa Research at FM Capital Partners
 Gitanjali S. Gutierrez - Attorney - Center for Constitutional Rights
 Tiffany Paynter - Spoken Word Artist
 Alan Gilbertson - Managing Director of FoodBank South Africa
 Daniel Lieberman, PHD - Professor of Human Evolutionary Biology, Harvard University
 Dr. Neil Burnie - Director of The Bermuda Shark Project
 Graham Foster - Sculptor / Painter

October 2011
 Lawrence Sass - Associate Professor at MIT's Department of Architecture
 Mike Ramsdell - Documentary Filmmaker
 Pen Hadow - Polar Explorer
 Joy T. Barnum - Bermudian Vocalist / Songwriter
 Larry Mills - Bermudian Builder
 Ryan Legassicke - Contemporary Canadian Artist
 Tony Ruto - CTO of Within Technologies Ltd
 Dickson Despommier - The Vertical Farming Project
 Jeffrey Masters - Co-founder of the Weather Underground

October 2012
 Jessica Lewis - Bermudian Paralympian, on making it to London 2012
 John Sculley - former CEO of Pepsi-Cola and Apple Inc. on "Medicine and the Cloud"
 Ross Stein - a geophysicist and expert on earthquake science, who discussed how to better forecast and manage the threat of earthquakes
 Sossina M. Haile - a professor of Materials Science and Chemical Engineering at Caltech who is working towards a carbon-neutral world by turning  into fuel
 Norman Seeff - a filmmaker and photographer who has dedicated much of his life to better understanding the creative process
 Hanli Prinsloo - freediving record holder and conservationist, on human connection to the sea: "I am Water"
 Peter Bentley - on "Embracing Chaos"—why science must learn from the randomness of nature
 Eric Barnhill - Juilliard trained pianist doing a PhD in Medical Physics on "Therapy Through Music"
 Felix Tod - producer on "Saving the Music Business, a Performance"
 K Gabrielle - Bermudian singer
 Alan Burland - Chairman of Bermuda Sloop Foundation, on "Education: Back to the Future"
 KASE - Bermudian rapper

October 2013
 Jinichi Kawakami - Japan's Last Ninja
 Arlene Brock - Bermuda’s Ombudsman
 Robert Lustig - Beating the Odds Against Sugar
 Natalie Kuldell - Synthesizing Change: Garage Genomics
 Andrew Park - TED Animation Guru
 Chip Yates - World's Fastest ePilot
 Bren Smith - 3D Ocean Farming
 Rafael Grossmann - Google Glass Surgery
 Hip Hop Fundamentals - Teaching Physics Using Breakdance
 Jeremy Gilley - Peace One Day founder

October 2014
 Ishrat Yakub - Motion Activated
 Oliver Steeds - The Future of Exploration
 Jason Healey - Saving Cyberspace
 Adjoa Andoh - What Determines Who You Are
 Uzimon/Daniel Frith - From Novelty to Enterprise
 Charles Hoskinson - The Future Will be Decentralised
 Lauren Bowker - Intelligent Textiles
 Weldon Wade - Diving With a Purpose
 Elizabeth Stokoe - The Conversational Racetrack
 Stephan Johnstone - Progression
 Carl Lipo - Easter Island: Lessons from One Small Island to Another

October 2015
 InMotion - Interconnected
 Martijn Berger - It's a Happy World After All
 Tom Gage - The Powerplant in Your Driveway
 Martha Dismont - I Have the Best Job in the World
 Michael Frith - Drawing Inspiration From One's Environment
 Radhika Nagpal - Taming the Swarm
 Clilly Castiglia - The Roar of the Crowd
 No Strings - When Puppets Speak, Children Listen
 Yesha Townsend - Home
 Barrington Irving - Creating the Next Generation of Explorers
 Stuart Lacey - The Future of Your Personal Data - Privacy vs Monetization
 Bryan Davis - The New Spirit of Innovation

October 2019
 Joan Higginbotham
 Richard Browning
 Domhnaill Hernon
 Harry Yeff aka Reeps One
 Jonna Hiestand Mendez
 Dr. Thomas Boothby, Ph.D. 
 Dr. Kelly Lambert 
 Alexander Rose
 Ed Christopher
 Oliver Rajamani

References

2011 in Bermuda
Recurring events established in 2011
Bermuda